The fourth season of Svenska Serien, at the time Sweden's top-tier hockey league, was scheduled to be held over the winter of 1938–39, but due to a harsh winter, the series was played as a shortened single-round robin tournament in the autumn of 1939, immediately prior to the start of the 1939–40 season.  For this reason, there was no promotion or relegation as a result of this tournament.  Hammarby IF went undefeated, winning all seven matches, to win the league title.  This was their first time Hammarby finished first-place in Svenska Serien, and the fourth time Hammarby finished first in Sweden's first-tier league (which had previously been Klass I and Elitserien).

Final standings

External links
1938-39 season

Swe
1938–39 in Swedish ice hockey
Svenska Serien (ice hockey) seasons